Sully Sports Football Club are a Welsh football club from Sully in the Vale of Glamorgan, Wales. They play in the South Wales Alliance League Division One, which is at the fifth tier of the Welsh football pyramid.

History
The origins of the football club can be traced to 1950 when "Barry Plastics Sports and Social was born which had no club room, no sports field but plenty of enthusiasm".  Events were organised via three prominent employers - Distillers, Goodrich and British Geon Ltd.  In 1952, Distillers obtained 37.5 acres of ground at the east end of the village of Sully. The covenant on the land was that one third of the ground would be used by the club and the remaining two-thirds would remain agricultural. The agreement was for 10 years. This led to the first sports pitches and a temporary pavilion being erected. In 1962, a permanent building, the Barry Plastics Sports and Social Club pavilion, was erected and formally opened in June. 

British Petroleum (BP) purchased the chemical and plastics interests of Distillers Company Ltd in 1967 and in 1968 took over the Sports and Social Club, supplying subsidies for the various sections including football. 

The football club was formed in 1972.

The team as BP Barry joined Division Two of the  South Wales Senior League for the 1992–93 season and were promoted to Division One at the end of the 1997–98 season after finishing as runners-up.

The partnership with BP continued until 1993 when BP Chemicals called a public meeting to discuss their plans to sell half the site for housing and to give the sports club the remainder. Various proposals were considered and BP accepted the Sports and Social Club's proposal to purchase  the Market Street and Sully Clubhouses along with their assets for £500,000. 

The club changed its name in 2001 to Sully Sports.  The club won back-to-back South Wales Senior League titles in the 2005–06 and 2006–07 seasons. The club were turned down for promotion to the Welsh Football League by the Football Association of Wales after the 2005–06 season because of the lack of a permanent stand.

They were again back-to-back champions in the 2011–12 season, where they played South Wales Amateur League champions Llantwit Major in the play-off for promotion to the Welsh Football League but lost the match, and in the 2012–13 season  where they lost to AFC Rhoose in the corresponding play-off game.

The club moved to the South Wales Alliance League upon its formation and remained in the Premier Division until the end of the 2019–20 season when they were one of five clubs relegated because of changes to the Welsh Football Pyramid ahead of the 2020–21 season. The 2020–21 season was cancelled due to the Covid-19 pandemic so instead the club's first season in Division One was 2021–22.

Honours

South Wales Alliance League Premier Division
Runners-up: 2015–16
South Wales Senior League Division One
Champions: 2005–06, 2006–07, 2011–12, 2012–13
Runners up: 2010–11, 2013–14
South Wales Senior League Division Two
Runners-up: 1997–98 (as BP Barry)
FAW Trophy
Winners: 2011–12
Runners-up: 2015–16
Bruty Cup
Winners: 2013–14
Vale of Glamorgan League
Division One – Champions: 2013–14 (reserves)
Division One – Champions: 2021-22 (reserves)

External links
Club official homepage

References

Football clubs in Wales
South Wales Alliance League clubs
South Wales Senior League clubs
1972 establishments in Wales
Association football clubs established in 1972
BP
Sport in the Vale of Glamorgan
Works association football teams in Wales